The Utah College of Dental Hygiene (UCDH), a division of Careers Unlimited, is a private, for-profit educational institution in Orem, Utah, United States that specializes in dental hygiene education. The school is accredited by the Accrediting Commission of Career Schools and Colleges (ACCSC). The dental hygiene program at Careers Unlimited was established in 2005 and was the first private dental hygiene program established in the state of Utah. UCDH offers one specialized accelerated program: the 20 month Bachelor of Science Degree in Dental Hygiene (BSDH).

External links

 

Private universities and colleges in Utah
Universities and colleges in Utah County, Utah